Jozaria is an extinct genus of stem perissodactyl from the Early to Middle Eocene of the Kuldana Formation of Kohat, Pakistan. It and other anthracobunids were formerly classified with proboscideans.

Only one specimen belonging to the species Jozaria palustris has been discovered so far. Geological evidences from the place of discovery indicate that the animal lived in a brackish marsh environment. It probably fed on soft aquatic vegetation.

References 

 N.A. Wells and P.D. Gingerich. 1983. Review of Eocene Anthracobunidae (Mammalia, Proboscidea) with a new genus and species, Jozaria palustris, from the Kuldana Formation of Kohat (Pakistan).  Contrib. Mus. Pal. Univ. Michigan 26(7): 117–139.

Eocene mammals of Asia
Eocene odd-toed ungulates
Transitional fossils
Prehistoric placental genera